Indrajith is a 2017 Indian Tamil-language action adventure film directed by Kalaprabhu and produced by his father Kalaipuli S. Thanu. The film features Gautham Karthik and Ashrita Shetty in the lead roles, while Sonarika Bhadoria, Sudhanshu Pandey, Sachin Khedekar, Nagendra Babu and M. S. Bhaskar play supporting roles. This film received majorly negative reviews. The film declared as flop at the box office.

Plot 
Mayilvaganam, a retired archeological professor, is in search of a mystical stone mentioned in the holy books, which has the ability to cure dreaded diseases like cancer. In his hunt for the stone, he forms a team of youngsters, which include Indrajith, a happy-go-lucky guy and adventure-junkie. Whilst the team has a well-laid out map, they are up against Kapil Sharma, the head of the Archaeological Survey of India and an old foe of Mayilvaganam. Later, when Indrajith gets the stone, he realizes that it is Mayilvaganam who is evil and not Sharma, so he gives the stone to Kapil. Mayilvaganam is jailed, and Sharma decides to share the stone with other countries as well to cure diseases on Indrajith's advice. Indrajith says," Let's share", and they all laugh. The story ends on this note.

Cast
Gautham Karthik as Indrajith
Sonarika Bhadoria as Meetah
Ashrita Shetty as Smitha
Sudhanshu Pandey as Kapil Sharma
Sachin Khedekar as Mayil Vahanam
Nagendra Babu as Ravi
M. S. Bhaskar as Salim
A. ilankumaran as Pilot
Rajveer Ankur Singh as Tarang Singh
Ranjjan
Amit
Nakshatra Nagesh as a student

Production
The collaboration between actor and director was first reported in October 2013, with Kalaprabhu revealing that his second venture after Sakkarakatti (2008), would be an action-adventure film produced by his father. Gautham Karthik was signed to play the title role, while actresses Ashrita Shetty and Sonarika Bhadoria were selected to play female leading roles. Shankar–Ehsaan–Loy were initially announced as the film's music composers, but delays later meant that newcomer KP was selected to compose the film's soundtrack and score. A first look poster for the film was revealed in January 2014, stating that production was in progress. The team announced that schedules were set to take place in Chennai, Arunachal Pradesh and then Goa, while also revealing that the title was a reference to the character Indrajith from the Indian epic Ramayana. It was later revealed that the film would be along the lines of the Indiana Jones films, with Gautham Karthik and Sonarika featuring in a group of fortune seekers, also including Sudanshu Pandey and theatre actor Amit.

The team began filming in early 2014, with shoots conducted in Chennai and Pondicherry. A further twelve-day shoot schedule in Goa during July 2014, with Sachin Khedekar joining the cast to portray a professor. After a long schedule break, the team reconvened in April 2015 to complete the rest of the shoot. Sports person turned actor Rajveer Singh is essaying the role of antagonist.

The film's teaser trailer was released during April 2016 and was attached to screenings featuring Thanu's other production, Theri (2016). In an interview in May 2016, Gautham Karthik revealed that the film was completed and was awaiting a release date.

Soundtrack

The film's soundtrack was composed by K. P.
"Sembaruthi" - Bombay Jayashree
"Aayiram Thamarai" - Karthik, Shilvi Sharon
"Kadhal Veesi" - Neha Bhasin
"Vidigira Vaanil" - Javed Ali
"Ennenna Kaatchigal" - Jaspreet Jasz, Arjun Chandy

Release and reception 
The Indian Express said, "Indrajith is an example of a lazily produced movie that doesn’t even try to keep the viewer engaged."

References

External links
 

2017 films
2010s action adventure films
Indian action adventure films
2010s Tamil-language films